Billboard Top Rock'n'Roll Hits: 1967 is a compilation album released by Rhino Records in 1989, featuring 10 hit recordings from 1967.

The original album includes six songs that reached the top of the Billboard Hot 100 chart. The remaining four tracks each reached the Hot 100's Top 10.  A re-issue in 1993 followed, replacing tracks by the Monkees, The Buckinghams, and Paul Revere & The Raiders with songs by Aretha Franklin, The Young Rascals, and Sam & Dave.

Absent from the track lineup were songs by The Beatles. A disclaimer on the back of the album stated that licensing restrictions made those tracks unavailable for inclusion on the album.

Track listing
Track information and credits taken from the album's liner notes.
1989 original release

1993 re-release, replacement tracks

References

1989 compilation albums
Billboard Top Rock'n'Roll Hits albums